Scheuerpflug is a German surname. Notable people with the surname include:

Andreas Scheuerpflug (born 1967), German volleyball player 
Paul Scheuerpflug (1896–1945), German World War II general 

German-language surnames